MLP may refer to:

Arts and entertainment 
 Major League Productions, a British record label
 Mini-LP
 My Little Pony, a toy originating in the 1980s which has also spawned multiple TV shows, most notably My Little Pony: Friendship Is Magic

Business 
 Master limited partnership, a type of business entity
 MLP AG (formerly ), a German financial services consulting firm

Computing 
 Memory-level parallelism, a computer architecture feature
 Meridian Lossless Packing, a lossless compression codec for audio data
 Micro Leadframe Package, a surface mount integrated circuit package
 Mobile Location Protocol, an application-level protocol for receiving the position of Mobile Stations
 Multilayer perceptron, a class of artificial neural network
 Multilink PPP, a networking technology
 Multilink Procedure, a networking technology

Politics 
 Hungarian Liberal Party, a liberal political party in Hungary
 Malta Labour Party
 Manitoba Labour Party, a defunct left-wing political party in Manitoba, Canada
 Manitoba Liberal Party, a centrist political party in Manitoba, Canada
 Marine Le Pen (born 1968), a French politician
 Mauricio López-Roberts (1873–1940), Spanish noble, diplomat and politician
 Marriage Law Project, an organization against same-sex marriage
 Melanesian Liberal Party, a political party in Papua New Guinea
 Memel Agricultural Party, a defunct pro-German political party in the Memel Territory
 Mexican Liberal Party, an anarchist group co-founded by Ricardo Flores Magón in 1905, in opposition to the rule of Porfirio Díaz

Technology 
 Mobile Landing Platform, original name for the Expeditionary Transfer Dock of the United States Navy
 Mobile launcher platform, a steel structure to support the launch vehicles
 Volkswagen Group MLB platform, from German

Other uses 
 Bargam language (ISO 639 code: mlp), a Papuan language
 Major League Pickleball
 Mid-level practitioner, a category of health-care providers with less training and more restricted scope of practice than physicians
 Municipal Light Plant, historic building in Columbus, Ohio, US